Tarzan and the Great River is a 1967 adventure film starring Mike Henry in his second of three film appearances as Tarzan. The film was produced by Sy Weintraub and Steve Shagan, written by Bob Barbash (from a story by Barbash and Lewis Reed), and directed by Robert Day.  It was released on September 1, 1967.

Plot
Tarzan is called to Brazil by an old friend, The Professor (Paulo Gracindo) to help stop the Jaguar Cult, led by Barcuma (Rafer Johnson), from destroying native villages and enslaving the survivors in his search for diamonds.  Tarzan is assisted by Captain Sam Bishop (Jan Murray), a riverboat pilot, and Bishop's young ward, Pepe (Manuel Padilla Jr.), as well as Baron (a lion) and Cheeta (a chimpanzee). On their way they encounter Dr. Ann Philips (Diana Millay), who has witnessed the destruction of a village, and wants to continue fighting a plague by giving much-needed inoculations to natives who live along the Amazon River.

Selected cast
 Mike Henry as Tarzan, the British Lord of Greystoke
 Jan Murray as Captain Sam Bishop, an American crusty riverboat pilot, ally to Tarzan
 Manuel Padilla, Jr. as Pepe, Sam Bishop's youthful native ward
 Rafer Johnson as Barcuma, Afro-Brazilian leader of the Jaguar Cult
 Diana Millay as Dr. Ann Philips, American physician attempting to inoculate Brazilian natives
 Paulo Gracindo as The Professor, Tarzan's Brazilian old friend
 Eliezer Gomes as Barcuma's Afro-Brazilian lieutenant (uncredited)
 Carlos Eduardo Dolabella as Agonizing tribesman in canoe (uncredited)
 Luz del Fuego as Tribeswoman (uncredited)

Production notes
The movie was filmed entirely on location in Rio de Janeiro, Brazil (Rio de Janeiro Zoo, Parque Lage and Tijuca Forest).

Dinky, the chimp portraying Cheeta, bit Mike Henry on the jaw during filming, requiring twenty stitches.  The chimpanzee was destroyed, and Henry later sued the producers for this accident and other unsafe working conditions on all three of his Tarzan films.  The parties settled out of court.

References

External links
 
 
 
 ERBzine Silver Screen: Tarzan and the Great River

1967 films
1960s fantasy adventure films
American fantasy adventure films
American sequel films
Films directed by Robert Day
Films set in Brazil
Films shot in Rio de Janeiro (city)
Tarzan films
Films produced by Sy Weintraub
1960s English-language films
1960s American films